Andrzej Piotr Andrzejewski (May 19, 1961 – January 23, 2008) was a Brigadier General of the Polish Air Force who died in the military plane crash in Mirosławiec along with other officers, among whom he was the highest ranking.

A graduate of the Academy of National Defense (1995) and, previously, the High Air Force School (1985), he had spent a long career in the Polish Air Force. Andrzejewski barely escaped death when his fighter, an Su-22M-4K, was accidentally shot down by Kub (SA-6) missile during an exercise on August 19, 2003. He ejected from the plane into the Baltic Sea and was rescued after an hour and a half.

Three years later, he was promoted to general and was appointed commander of the 1st Brigade of the Tactical Aircraft in Mirosławiec. He remained in command until his death.

He spent over 1000 hours in planes.

On January 23 2008, the EADS CASA C-295 which Andrzejewski and fellow officers were aboard, flying from Warsaw via Powidz and Krzesiny to Mirosławiec, crashed during an approach to the 12th Air Base near Mirosławiec. There were no survivors.

Andrzejewski was the highest ranking Polish general to die in duty for decades. He was 46 years old. He is survived by his wife, Małgorzata, and his two daughters, Klaudyna (26) and Patrycja (21). He was posthumously promoted to Division General.

The President of the Republic of Poland, Lech Kaczyński, ordered three-days of national mourning after the fatal crash.

References
Biography with photo of General Andrzejewski

1961 births
2008 deaths
Aviators killed in aviation accidents or incidents
People from Sochaczew
Polish generals
Polish aviators
Knights of the Order of Polonia Restituta
Recipients of the Bronze Cross of Merit (Poland)
Victims of aviation accidents or incidents in Poland
Victims of aviation accidents or incidents in 2008